Robert van Dijk (born 15 January 1969) is a Dutch retired footballer who played as a goalkeeper.

Over the course of exactly 20 seasons as a professional, he appeared in 364 Eredivisie games, mainly with RKC (nine years) and Feyenoord (seven). He retired at the age of 43.

Early life
Van Dijk was born in Voorhout, South Holland. In his youth, he never thought he would make it to become a professional footballer. He only enjoyed playing football with his friends on amateur level, while his dream was to become a physical education teacher.

Club career

Youth
Van Dijk started his career at local team Foreholte, as a meritorious sweeper, who 'roamed' around the back line. Goalkeeper in his team was two-year younger Edwin van der Sar: "I was the last man to kick all the balls away, while Edwin did the rest. It was a nice time. I still talk to him occasionally."

At the age of 19, van Dijk started playing futsal with some friends in a recreational team. As someone had to be the goalkeeper, he made the sacrifice, which went well above expectation. When van der Sar left Foreholte for vv Noordwijk, van Dijk switched his position on the field and became the goalkeeper of the club's reserves, being promoted to the first team after one season.

Quickly various professional sides were interested in the talented goalkeeper, and van Dijk had a short trial at Ajax Amsterdam, who were in need of a third goalkeeper. However, Ajax decided to pick his former teammate van der Sar, while van Dijk went on to have a short spell at vv Noordwijk as van der Sar's successor, but soon grabbed the chance to become reserve goalkeeper at Feyenoord.

Professionals
Only three years after the playing position switch, van Dijk made his goalkeeping debut in Feyenoord's first team. On 5 December 1992, he replaced Dean Gorré in the 59th minute of the first division match against Vitesse Arnhem (2–2), after starting keeper Ed de Goey was sent off after a foul in the penalty area. Phillip Cocu scored the penalty kick and became the first player to score against van Dijk on professional level. Van Dijk had his highlight two years after his debut: on 30 November 1994, he replaced the injured de Goey in the cup contest against Willem II (1–1 aet), performing well enough to earn Man of the match accolades, after a penalty shootout.

After four seasons playing only four league matches for Feyenoord, van Dijk decided to request a transfer: "De Goey wasn't going to leave. That was pretty much it. I've been a substitute behind Ed for four years. At the moment I had the chance, it didn't look like De Goey would leave any time soon. At RKC Waalwijk I could become the first goalkeeper."

Van Dijk stayed at RKC Waalwijk for seven consecutive seasons, playing a total of 214 Eredivisie matches for the club. Just before the final fixture of 2002–03, it was announced the goalkeeper would strengthen PSV Eindhoven's squad during the next season.

At PSV, van Dijk signed a two-year deal with the reigning champions of the Netherlands, backing up experienced Ronald Waterreus for the entire campaign, with only one appearance to his credit: on 16 May 2004, he was placed in goal when PSV traveled to AZ and recorded a 2–4 win. For 2004–05, he would become fourth-choice, behind Heurelho Gomes, Edwin Zoetebier and Nathan Coe.

Van Dijk had one year left of his contract in Eindhoven, but was able to leave the club on a free transfer by mutual agreement. On 9 July 2004, he left the club and signed with De Graafschap.

Van Dijk signed for two years at De Graafschap, but missed the majority of his first year, due to a knee injury; the full recovery took months, as the doctors discovered severe cartilage wear. De Graafschap finished on the 17th place and relegated to the second level.

Subsequently, van Dijk returned to RKC in the summer of 2005, becoming first choice and not missing one single match during his first season. However, he had a less successful season 2006–07 as, due to bad results, RKC Waalwijk coach Adrie Koster was fired on 27 November 2006. The new coach, Mark Wotte, started experimenting with reserve goalkeeper Jurgen Wevers, who eventually became first-choice.

On 30 January 2007, SC Heerenveen announced the arrival of van Dijk as their new reserve, behind Brian Vandenbussche. He stayed at the club for two years, amassing a total of 15 first division games.

On 1 September 2008, 39-year-old van Dijk returned to Feyenoord. He was promoted to starter in his second year, following the retirement of another veteran, Henk Timmer.

On 24 October 2010, 41-year-old van Dijk was in goal as Feyenoord lost 0–10 at former team PSV, the club's heaviest defeat ever. He retired from football at the end of the season, having appeared 18 times in the league; on 9 August 2011, however, it was announced that the player had signed a one-year contract with FC Utrecht, as Michel Vorm signed for Swansea City and Roberto Fernández was out for three months with an injury.

Honours
Feyenoord
Eredivisie: 1992–93
KNVB Cup: 1993–94, 1994–95

Club statistics

References

External links
Feyenoord official profile 
Beijen profile 
Stats at Voetbal International 

1969 births
Living people
People from Teylingen
Dutch footballers
Association football goalkeepers
VV Noordwijk players
Feyenoord players
RKC Waalwijk players
PSV Eindhoven players
De Graafschap players
SC Heerenveen players
FC Utrecht players
Eredivisie players
Footballers from South Holland